A thymiaterion (from Ancient Greek: θυμιατήριον from θυμιάειν thymiaein "to smoke"; plural thymiateria) is a type of censer or incense burner, used in the Mediterranean region since antiquity for spiritual and religious purposes and especially in religious ceremonies.

The term is used not only for the censers of ancient Greece, from where the term comes, but also to describe the censers of other peoples of the ancient world, such as the Phoenicians and Etruscans.

Thymiateria could take a wide variety of forms, ranging from simple earthenware pots to elaborate carved, moulded or cast items made from clay or bronze.

Various types of thymiateria are still used in the Greek Orthodox rituals in churches, homes, cemeteries etc. They are commonly known also as "livanisteria" (from the w. Livanos, incense).

References

Ancient Greek religion
Incense equipment
Greek Orthodoxy